Elements that are considered "noble" include:

 noble gases
 noble metals